Ernő Rubik (27 November 1910 in Pöstyén, Austria-Hungary, now Piešťany, Slovakia – 13 February 1997) was a Hungarian aircraft designer and father of Ernő Rubik, the architect who became famous for his mechanical puzzles (e.g. the Rubik's Cube).

Biography 
During the 1930s, he designed several gliders for manufacture by Műegyetemi Sportrepülő Egyesület, the sport flying association of the Budapest Technical University. In the years following the Second World War, these designs were followed by a number of powered aircraft, making Rubik the country's most prolific aircraft designer. These were manufactured by his own enterprise, Aero-Ever in Esztergom, until the firm was nationalised in 1948 as Sportárutermelő Vállalat.

One of his most famous aircraft is the R-26 Góbé, a popular training glider in Hungary.

Notes

References

1910 births
1997 deaths
People from Piešťany
Hungarians in Slovakia
20th-century Hungarian inventors
Aircraft designers